Elifelet is a moshav in northern Israel. Located on the Korazim Plateau near Rosh Pina, it falls under the jurisdiction of Mevo'ot HaHermon Regional Council.

Etymology
The name "Elifelet" is borrowed from several characters in the Hebrew Bible who were also named Elifelet, for example one of the sons of King David and a repatriate after the Babylonian Captivity.

History
The moshav was founded in 1949 by immigrants from Yemen belonging to the Moshavim Movement on the former village grounds of the depopulated Palestinian village of al-Zanghariyya. Although it was abandoned after several years, it was resettled during the 1950s by immigrants from North Africa and Iraq.

The moshav is known for producing edible grasshoppers for culinary use.

References

Moshavim
Populated places in Northern District (Israel)
Populated places established in 1949
1949 establishments in Israel
Yemeni-Jewish culture in Israel